Dignomus is a genus of beetles belonging to the family Ptinidae.

The species of this genus are found in Europe and Northern America.

Species:
 Dignomus albipilis (Reitter, 1884) 
 Dignomus aticus (Pic, 1902)

References

Ptinidae